Skillern Peak, at  above sea level is a peak in the Smoky Mountains of Idaho. The peak is located in Sawtooth National Forest in Camas County. It is located in the watershed of Big Smoky Creek, a tributary of the South Fork of the Boise River. No roads or trails go to the summit, although a trail is on the side of the mountain.

References 

Mountains of Idaho
Mountains of Camas County, Idaho
Sawtooth National Forest